William Frederick Curtis (29 May 1881 – 23 December 1962) was an English cricketer. Curtis was a right-handed batsman. He was born at Leicester, Leicestershire.

Curtis made his first-class debut for Leicestershire against Sussex in the 1911 County Championship at Aylestone Road, Leicester. He next appeared in first-class cricket for the county in 1920, making four appearances in that seasons County Championship, the last of which came against Somerset. In his five matches, he scored a total of 69 runs at an average of 8.62, with a high score of 38.

He died at the city of his birth on 23 December 1962.

References

External links
William Curtis at ESPNcricinfo
William Curtis at CricketArchive

1881 births
1962 deaths
Cricketers from Leicester
English cricketers
Leicestershire cricketers